Heteropleuronema is a monotypic genus of nematodes in the family Diplogastridae. The only species described so far is
Heteropleuronema unum. It has been isolated from fungi in Vietnam.

References

Diplogastridae
Diplogasteria